Pachystolini is a tribe of longhorn beetles of the subfamily Lamiinae. It was described by Per Olof Christopher Aurivillius in 1922.

Taxonomy
 Cyclotaenia Jordan, 1903
 Falshomelix Breuning, 1956
 Gymnostylus Aurivillius, 1916
 Hypsideres Jordan, 1903
 Hypsideroides Breuning, 1938
 Macrochia Jordan, 1903
 Mallonia Thomson, 1857
 Orica Pascoe, 1888
 Pachystola Reiche, 1850
 Paracyclotaenia Breuning, 1935
 Paratragon Téocchi & Sudre, 2002
 Peloconus Jordan, 1906
 Spodotaenia Fairmaire, 1884
 Synhomelix Kolbe, 1893
 Tragon Murray, 1871

References

 
Lamiinae
Taxa named by Per Olof Christopher Aurivillius